Anastasia Konstantinovna Stavrova is a Russian mathematician specializing in algebraic groups, non-associative algebra, and algebraic K-theory. She is a researcher in the Chebyshev Laboratory at Saint Petersburg State University.

Education and career
Stavrova earned a specialist degree in mathematics at Saint Petersburg State University in 2005. After traveling to the University of Leiden and University of Padua for a master's degree, which she completed in 2007, she returned to Saint Petersburg State University for her doctoral studies. Her 2009 dissertation, Structure of Isotropic Reductive Groups, was supervised by Nikolai Vavilov.

She returned to Saint Petersburg State University as a researcher, after doing postdoctoral research from 2010 to 2012 at Ludwig Maximilian University of Munich and the University of Duisburg-Essen in Germany, and in 2013 as the Jerrold E. Marsden Postdoctoral Fellow at the Fields Institute in Canada.

Recognition
Stavrova won the Young Mathematician Prize of the Saint Petersburg Mathematical Society in 2009, and the Young Russian Mathematics Scholarship in 2016.

References

External links

Year of birth missing (living people)
Living people
Russian mathematicians
Women mathematicians
Leiden University alumni
University of Padua alumni